José "Nía" Rivera Díaz is a Puerto Rican businessman and former politician. He was mayor of Trujillo Alto from 1977 to 1980.

Rivera served in the U.S. Army and was stationed in southern West Germany in the early 1960s. There, he met and married Christa Schätz, a German woman. They moved to New York, where they begat Ly
nda and Thomas (who became a Puerto Rican Senator and President of the Senate of Puerto Rico). In 1966, they moved to Puerto Rico and begat their daughter Sylvia.

References

Living people
People from Trujillo Alto, Puerto Rico
New Progressive Party (Puerto Rico) politicians
Mayors of places in Puerto Rico
United States Army soldiers
Year of birth missing (living people)
20th-century Puerto Rican politicians